The Kerala State Film Award for Best Child Artist is an award, begun in 1969, presented annually at the Kerala State Film Awards of India for the best performance by a child actor in the Malayalam cinema. Until 1997, the awards were managed directly by the Department of Cultural Affairs of the Government of Kerala. Since 1998, the awards have been controlled by the Kerala State Chalachitra Academy, an autonomous, non-profit institution functioning under the Department of Cultural Aff airs.

Winners

References

External links

PRD, Govt. of Kerala: Awardees List

Kerala State Film Awards